Altınsu is a village in the Şemdinli District in Hakkâri Province in Turkey. The village is populated by Kurds of the Zerzan tribe and had a population of 4,890 in 2022. Altınsu has the four hamlets of İncesu, Meydan, Elde and Balova attached to it.

The village is mainly engaged in agriculture.

Population 
Population history of the village from 2000 to 2022:

References 

Villages in Şemdinli District
Kurdish settlements in Hakkâri Province